Sarawak FM (formerly known as Radio Sarawak and Radio Malaysia Sarawak and stylised as SARAWAK fm) is a Malay language radio station operated by Radio Televisyen Malaysia serving as the main radio station of the state of Sarawak. It was launched on 8 June 1954 and became part of the Radio Malaysia network on 16 September 1963, when Sarawak formed the Federation of Malaysia with Malaya, Sabah and Singapore. The station covers the whole of Sarawak with a 24 hours broadcast which airs Malaysian and international music.

Radio Frequencies

Television

References

External links 
 

Radio stations in Malaysia
Mass media in Kuching
Malay-language radio stations
Radio Televisyen Malaysia